Paris Smith is an American actress. She is known for playing Maddie Van Pelt in the Nickelodeon show Every Witch Way.

Career
Other appearances include Totally, The Bedtime Story, and others. She has also appeared on episodes of The Fine Brothers' YouTube show React to That.

Smith won the Best Performance in a Short Film – Young Actress 11–12 award for the short film Scouted at Young Artist Award 2013, and was nominated in 2014 for the Best Performance in a TV Series – Guest Starring Young Actress 11–13 award for Modern Family, and in 2015 won for the Best Performance in a TV Series – Leading Young Actress award for Every Witch Way.

Filmography

Accolades

References

External links
 

American child actresses
American television actresses
21st-century American actresses
Living people
Year of birth missing (living people)